Želimir Zagorac (born March 9, 1981 in Gospić, SR Croatia, Yugoslavia) is a professional basketball player. He is 204 cm tall and currently plays for KK Ježica.

Zagorac competed for Slovenia at the 2006 FIBA World Championship; he has a younger brother, Saša, who is also a basketball player.

References

1981 births
Living people
ABA League players
Aliağa Petkim basketball players
Basketball Löwen Braunschweig players
Centers (basketball)
KD Slovan players
KK Olimpija players
KK Włocławek players
PBC Lokomotiv-Kuban players
PBC Ural Great players
Power forwards (basketball)
Slovenian men's basketball players
Sportspeople from Gospić
2006 FIBA World Championship players
Helios Suns players